L'homme voilé (also known as The Veiled Man) is a 1987 Lebanese-French drama film  written and directed by Maroun Bagdadi.

The film was entered into the main competition at the 44th edition of the Venice Film Festival, where  Bernard Giraudeau received the Golden Ciak for best actor.

Plot

Cast  
  Bernard Giraudeau as Pierre
  Michel Piccoli as Kassar
  Laure Marsac as Claire
  Michel Albertini  as Kamal
  Sandrine Dumas as Julie
   Fouad Naim  as Kamal's uncle
   Sonia Ichti  as Kamal's lover
   Jonathan Layana  as Marouane
   Kamal Kassar  as Youssef

References

External links

1987 drama films
1987 films
Films directed by Maroun Bagdadi
French drama films
Films scored by Gabriel Yared
Lebanese drama films
1980s French-language films
1980s French films